Great Is He is the fifth studio album by Jamaican singer Popcaan. It was released through OVO Sound on 27 January 2023. The album features guest appearances from Toni-Ann Singh, Burna Boy, Drake, and Chronic Law. Production was handled by Kid Culture, Demario Duncan, Dane Ray, The Fanatix, Anju Blaxx, Dre Skull, Tresor, Batundi, TJ Records, Dan Sky, Atto Wallace, Steven Francisco, Savchenko Anton, Mojam, and Wez. The album serves as the follow-up to Popcaan's previous album, Fixtape (2020).

Release and promotion
Popcaan revealed the title of the album in early 2022, later promising a release date near the end of the year, which, however, did not happen. He revealed the cover art in early 2023. He revealed the tracklist exactly a week before its release date.

Singles
The lead single of the album, "Skeleton Cartier", was released on 4 March 2022. The second single, "Next to Me", was released on 30 November 2022. The third single, "Set It", was released on 16 December 2022. The fourth single, "We Caa Done", which features Canadian rapper and singer Drake, was released on 6 January 2023. The fifth and final single, the title track, was released on 20 January 2023.

Track listing

Notes
 signifies a co-producer

References

2023 albums
OVO Sound albums
Popcaan albums